Altered State (2005) is the 16th studio album (18th overall) from the jazz group Yellowjackets, and their third release for the Heads Up International label.

The cover image was painted by pop art painter Peter Max.

Track listing

Personnel 
Yellowjackets
 Russell Ferrante – acoustic piano, electric piano, keyboards
 Jimmy Haslip – electric bass
 Marcus Baylor – drums
 Bob Mintzer – tenor saxophone, soprano saxophone, bass clarinet, EWI

Guest Musicians
 Mike Shapiro – percussion (1, 4)
 Jean Baylor – lead vocal (3)
 Sharon Perry – backing vocals (3)
 Lori Perry – backing vocals (3)
 Carolyn Perry – backing vocals (3)
 Darlene Perry – backing vocals (3)

Production 
 Yellowjackets – producers
 Dave Love – executive producer
 Bill Schnee – recording engineer
 Rich Breen – mixing, mastering 
 Ryan Petry – assistant engineer
 Margi Denton – graphic design
 Mitch Haupers (KVON) –  photography
 Robert Hoffman – live photography 
 Peter Max – cover artwork

Studios
 Recorded at Schnee Studios (Studio City, CA).
 Mixed and Mastered at Dogmatic Studios (Burbank, CA).

References

2005 albums
Yellowjackets albums